The Serbian copyright act was published as the copyright act of Serbia and Montenegro on 24 December 2004, and it remains in force after the country's split under the "Declaration of Continuation by Republic of Serbia", September 19, 2006.

Contents
The act consists of eight sections: 
Subject-matter of the act
Copyright
Related rights
Exercise of copyright and related rights
Records of works of authorship and subject-matters of related rights
Protection of copyright and related rights
Penal provisions
Transitional and final provisions

Scope
The act defines the "work of authorship" as an "author's original intellectual creation, expressed in a certain form, regardless of its value, purpose, size and contents". The following are considered as "works of authorship in particular":

 Written works 
 Spoken works (lectures, speeches, orations, etc.);
 Dramatic, dramatic-musical, choreographic and pantomime works, as well as works originating from folklore;
 Works of music
 Films (cinema and television);
 Fine art works
 Works of architecture, applied art and industrial design;
 Cartographic works
 Drawings, sketches, dummies and photographs;
 The direction of a theatre play.

Exemptions
According to the Article 6 (section 2) of the act,

The protection of copyright shall not apply to general ideas, principles and instructions included in a work of authorship.
The following shall not be deemed works of authorship:
 Laws, decrees and other regulations;
 Official materials of state bodies and bodies performing public functions;
 Official translations of regulations and official materials of state bodies and bodies performing public functions;
 Submissions and other documents presented in the administrative or court proceedings.

See also
 List of parties to international copyright treaties

References
 The Law on Copyright and Related Rights
 Tiede/Bogedain, "Introduction to the Copyright law of the Republic of Serbia" ("Einführung in das Urheberrecht der Republik Serbien"), in WiRO 2012 (German Law Journal), vol. 1, pp. 13–18 (in German language)

External links
 Intellectual Property Office, Republic of Serbia - Legislation

Serbia
Law of Serbia